Souk El Khemis is a town and commune in Bouïra Province, Algeria. According to the 1998 census it had a population of 8,039.
The town is located at 36 ° 23 '17 "n, 3 ° 38' 06"e and the name means Thursday Market.

The ruins of an ancient Roman town called Tatilti are nearby Souk El Khemis.

See also

Souk El Khemis, Tunisia

References

Communes of Bouïra Province
Archaeological sites in Algeria
Roman towns and cities in Algeria
Ancient Berber cities
Populated places established in the 1st millennium BC
1st-millennium BC establishments
Cities in Algeria
Algeria